Unión Popular de Langreo is a Spanish football team based in Langreo, in the autonomous community of Asturias. Founded in 1961, it plays in Segunda División RFEF – Group 1, holding its home games at Estadio Ganzábal in La Felguera, with a capacity of 4,024 seats.

History
UP Langreo was founded on 4 July 1961, after the merge of local teams CP La Felguera and Racing de Sama, which had a fierce rivalry. The merge was made with the aim of overcoming from the rivalry between Sama and La Felguera not only in football, but in all areas.

In its first season, Langreo achieved promotion to Segunda División, where it played during eight seasons out of the next ten years. Since its second relegation from Segunda to Tercera División, the club always played between Tercera and Segunda División B, the new third tier created in 1977, where UP Langreo played for the first time in its inaugural season.

In 1994, Langreo played the promotion playoffs to Segunda División, but it finished in the last position of its group, composed also by CF Extremadura, AEC Manlleu and CD Numancia.

Since that year, Langreo continues playing alternatively between Segunda División B and Tercera División. In the 2017–18 season the club promoted back to Segunda División B after spending three seasons in Tercera and qualified for the Copa del Rey thus ending with an 18-year absence in the competition, the largest in the club's history.

Stadium

Since its foundation, Langreo plays in Estadio Ganzábal. Entirely renovated in 2006, it has capacity for 4,024 spectators.

Rivalries
Langreo's historic rival is Caudal Deportivo. Both teams meet in the Asturian Mining basins derby. The club also has a strong rivalry with Real Avilés.

Season to season

8 seasons in Segunda División
19 seasons in Segunda División B
2 seasons in Segunda División RFEF
33 seasons in Tercera División

Current squad

Honours
Tercera División: 1961–62, 1969–70, 1981–82, 1985–86, 2001–02
Copa RFEF (Asturias tournament): 1997, 2008, 2017

Notable players

 Kily
 Juan Carlos Álvarez
 Michu
 David Villa (youth)

Presidents

Source:

References

External links
Official website 
Non official website 
BDFútbol team profile

 
Football clubs in Asturias
Association football clubs established in 1961
Langreo
1961 establishments in Spain
Segunda División clubs